The Multidimensional Aptitude Battery II is a group-administered intelligence test created by psychologist Douglas N. Jackson which is supposed to measure Verbal, Performance and Full Scale IQ. The battery consists of 10 subtests and is used for various professional, medical, military, government, law enforcement and employment settings. The test-retest reliability based on timed performance correlates with values of 0.95 for the verbal section, 0.96 for the performance section and 0.97 for the full scale.

Subtests and items 

Citation.

Description 
The MAB II was created by psychologist Douglas N. Jackson and published by the company SIGMA Assessment Systems Inc. It is designed to measure intellectual abilities of both adults and adolescents from ages 16 and over and can be used in any educational and career counselling settings, business, industries, clinics and mental health facilities for basic research. It can also be used in the government, law enforcement and military settings. MAB II is also available in languages such as Spanish and French. Both the Verbal and Performance subtests on the MAB II takes 50 mins to finish either through computer administration or psychologist administration. All of the subtests are also constructed through multiple choice questions and went through fair item selection for diverse groups including gender, nationality, age and culture. Age norms are also presented in the manual that comes with test.

Despite not being designed with the CHC model in mind, one study found that the test data conformed to this model.

See also 
 Woodcock-Johnson Tests of Cognitive Abilities
 WAIS IV
 Raven's Progressive Matrices
 Standford-Binet Intelligence Scales
 Reynolds Intellectual Assessment Scales
 IQ

References 

Cognitive tests
Intelligence tests